Edwin Peter Andrews (born 18 March 1977 in Cape Town, South Africa) is a South African politician serving as the Deputy Mayor of Cape Town since November 2021. A former rugby union footballer, his usual position was prop, and he played for the Springboks. He played for the Stormers in the Super 14 between 2003 and 2007.

Rugby career

Andrews made his provincial debut for Western Province against Eastern Province in the Vodacom Cup in 2000. Three seasons later he made his Super 12 debut for the Stormers against the Hurricanes.

Andrews made his international debut for South Africa on Saturday, 12 June 2004 in Bloemfontein in a match against Ireland. South Africa won the match 31–17. He also played in the subsequent match against the Irish in Cape Town which was also won by South Africa and was a reserve in the victory over Wales in Pretoria.

He went on to play against the Pacific Islanders team in Gosford before he was included in the Springboks' 2004 Tri Nations series squad. He played four tests during the series, two tests against the All Blacks and the Wallabies. The Springboks went on to win the Tri Nations that year. He earned another three caps during the end of year tests in the northern hemisphere.

He next played for South Africa on 18 June 2005 in a 30-all draw against France in Durban, as well as playing in subsequent matches against Australia, and then against the All Blacks in the 2005 Tri Nations series. He earned another two caps at the end of the year, playing Argentina in Buenos Aires and France in Paris.

He played in the three 2006 mid-year rugby tests, in the two wins against Scotland and the loss to France. He was then named in the Springboks' 2006 Tri Nations series squad.

He retired from professional rugby in 2007 due to spinal stenosis which was complicated by a recurring back injury. During this time he founded a non-profit organisation, Joshua Foundation, with his Stormers team mate Tonderai Chavhanga.

Test history

Political career
Andrews later joined the Democratic Alliance and was elected to the Cape Town City Council. He served as the ward councillor for ward 78 (Mitchells Plain), before being elected as the ward councillor  for ward 73 (Diep River and Meadowridge) in 2021. On 18 November 2021, Andrews was elected as the Deputy Mayor of Cape Town, succeeding Ian Neilson, who had announced his retirement from the role after twelve years.

See also
List of South Africa national rugby union players – Springbok no.  759

References

External links
Eddie Andrews on thestormers.com
Eddie Andrews on sporting-heroes.net
Eddie Andrews on SArugby.com
Andrews on joshuafoundation.org.za

South African rugby union players
South Africa international rugby union players
Cape Coloureds
Stormers players
Western Province (rugby union) players
Rugby union props
1977 births
Living people
Democratic Alliance (South Africa) politicians
Rugby union players from Cape Town